German submarine U-680 was a Type VIIC U-boat of Nazi Germany's Kriegsmarine during World War II. The submarine was laid down on 12 October 1942 at the Howaldtswerke yard at Hamburg, launched on 20 November 1943, and commissioned on 23 December 1943 under the command of Oberleutnant zur See Max Ulber.

Attached to 31st U-boat Flotilla based at Kiel, U-680 completed her training period on 31 July 1944 and was assigned to front-line service.

Design
German Type VIIC submarines were preceded by the shorter Type VIIB submarines. U-680 had a displacement of  when at the surface and  while submerged. She had two shafts and two  propellers.

U-680 was fitted with five  torpedo tubes (four fitted at the bow and one at the stern), fourteen torpedoes, one  SK C/35 naval gun, (220 rounds), one  Flak M42 and two twin  C/30 anti-aircraft guns. The boat had a complement of between forty-four and sixty.

Service history

References

Bibliography

External links

German Type VIIC submarines
1943 ships
Ships built in Hamburg
U-boats commissioned in 1943
U-boats sunk in 1945
Operation Deadlight
World War II submarines of Germany